Bilolutsk is an urban-type settlement in the Starobilsk Raion of Luhansk Oblast in Ukraine. Prior to 2020, it was located in the Novopskov Raion. Population:

References

Urban-type settlements in Starobilsk Raion
Starobilsk Raion
Starobelsky Uyezd